Nico, 1988 is a 2017 biographical film based on pop singer Nico directed by Susanna Nicchiarelli. A co-production between Italy and Belgium, it was shot in English language. The film had its world premiere at the Venice Festival on 31 August 2017. The film follows Nico during the last year of her life.

Plot
During World War Two, a young Christa Päffgen watches Berlin being bombed from a distance. 

In 1988, Päffgen—now known as Nico—is living in Manchester. Having risen to fame as a model and a singer for The Velvet Underground, she is tired of talking about her past and prefers to revel in her current image as a bohemian artist. She plans to embark on tour of Europe with her new manager, Richard. He assembles a band for her and they set off on the road. Nico's addiction to heroin soon proves to be a problem: she is rude to Richard, delivers abrasive performances and angrily berates her band during a concert in Italy before storming off stage. However, she forms a close friendship with Dome La Muerte who tries to focus her attention on performing. Nico confides to him that she enjoys living a life of excess having experienced hunger and poverty in the aftermath of the war. 

Before a concert in Paris, Nico mentions her son Ari during an interview and explains she was too wild to have a child at the time of his birth. She goes to visit him in an institution in France where he has been placed due to a suicide attempt and drug addiction. Richard agrees to a have Nico perform a guerrilla gig in communist Czechoslovakia at the behest of local dissident artists. Before the performance, Nico becomes angry when she cannot procure heroin and accuses the hosts of stealing her passport. Richard sternly reminds her that there are people around the world who still love her music and that the Czechoslovakian audience are taking a risk to see her perform. During the gig, Nico delivers a passionate performance to the delight of the crowd but the gig is brought to an abrupt halt as police raid the venue. 

Nico and her band manage to escape to West Germany where they plan for Nico's final tour performance in West Berlin. Richard praises her performance and agrees to help her get clean and retrieve Ari from the institution. Things start going well for Nico and her band as she gives up drugs, but Ari attempts suicide and is placed in hospital. Nico states to Dome that she plans to retire from performing so she can grow old elegantly. Ari is released from hospital and Richard encourages him and Nico to take a long holiday to recuperate. He negotiates a new contract with Nico before she departs ensuring that she and Ari receive their share of royalties from her days with The Velvet Underground and they promise to record a new album together upon her return. 

Nico travels to Ibiza for her holiday, but as revealed in the credits, she died on the island on 18 July 1988 at the age of 49 following a cycling accident.

Cast 
 Trine Dyrholm - Nico
 John Gordon Sinclair - Richard
 Anamaria Marinca - Sylvia
 Sandor Funtek - Ari
 Thomas Trabacchi - Domenico
 Karina Fernandez - Laura

Production 
The movie was a collaboration between the director and main actress Trine Dyrholm; they co-created the character. Dyrholm stated: "We created this version of Nico together". Dyrholm sang all the songs in the movie; she restructured the music with a musician and a band. They worked into a music studio before shooting. Nicchiarelli did a lot of research and she flew to Manchester to meet Nico's manager. She also interviewed Nico's son, Ari. He read the first draft and later the final script.

The film was shot in the square format instead of rectangular format. Nicchiarelli explained: "One of the main choices was the atmosphere of the second half of the 1980s which is very interesting; it has the decadence and the quality of the VHS. They worked on the quality of the VHS and tried to reproduce that, that kind of feeling. VHS and television are square format and it forces you to stay on the characters. I think it is interesting when cinema goes back to the square. Lately, some of the best films I've seen are square".

Nicchiarelli used images of the real Nico's face and early video footage of Jonas Mekas. She wrote to him and he answered her immediately. Nicchiarelli said: "It is fun to work with archive material in fiction movies".

Release 
The movie went to general release in the US in early August 2018. On review aggregator Rotten Tomatoes, the film has an approval rating of 94% based on 62 reviews, with an average rating of 7.2/10. The website's critical consensus reads; "Nico, 1988 takes an absorbing – and appropriately idiosyncratic – look at the singer's later years." On Metacritic, the film has an average weighted score of 75 out of 100, based on 21 critics, indicating "favorable reviews".

Dyrholm, who played Nico, received critical acclaim for her performance. Variety hailed her as "a powerhouse of authenticity. Her moroseness is mesmerizing, but she also gives Nico a tense intelligence, and her singing is uncanny." The Los Angeles Times also raved about Dyrholm as "an actress of formidable presence", giving "strong, truthful, unflinching performance that powers the film the way Christa's energy powered the bands she was in those late days". The New York Times also praised how Dyrholm was photographed in "brutally unforgiving close-up", saying that it "fully captures the faded charisma of the singer" in the last year of her existence. Joe Morgenstern in Wall Street Journal emphased, saying:  "I’ve never seen a performance quite like it — unsparingly harsh, but also graceful, droll and tender, a portrait of soul-weariness laced with a yearning for salvation."

At the Venice Film Festival in 2017, it won the Orrizonti Award for Best Film. At the Donatellos in 2018, (which work in Italy on the same criteria as the Oscars), it won the Best Original Script award, and was nominated in the Best Films category. At the 9th Magritte Awards, it received a nomination in the category of Best Foreign Film in Coproduction.

References

External links 

 
 
 
 

2017 films
Films directed by Susanna Nicchiarelli
Biographical films about singers
Biographical films about actors
Cultural depictions of German women
Cultural depictions of rock musicians
Cultural depictions of actors
2017 biographical drama films
Films shot in Germany
English-language Italian films
English-language Belgian films
2010s English-language films
Films set in the 1980s
Belgian historical films
Belgian biographical drama films
Italian historical films
Italian biographical drama films
2017 drama films
2010s drama road movies